Strathmerton is a closed railway station on the Goulburn Valley railway in the town of Strathmerton, Victoria, Australia. The station opened at the same time as the railway from Shepparton to Cobram on 1 October 1888, with the line to Tocumwal not opening until 28 February 1905, ending at a temporary terminus on the south side of the Murray River, the line not completed into Tocumwal until July 1908. The junction between the lines was to the north of the station, facing down trains.

Passenger services to Tocumwal ended on 8 November 1975 with the last train operated by T class diesel locomotive T324 and 3AS - 31BE - 2AE - 22CE. Before this time the Strathmerton - Cobram section of the line was operated as the 'branch line' with a 102hp Walker railmotor connecting with the main line train. A bus service was then introduced for the Tocumwal branch, connecting with the Cobram service. By 1977/78 the service between Cobram and Tocumwal was being operated by a VicRail owned station wagon driven by the Cobram station master.

Passenger services to the station were discontinued in 1981 when the Numurkah to Cobram service ended under the New Deal timetable, but were again resumed in 1983.

The station building was replaced with shelters in 1990/1991.

The final closure was in 1993, when the Cobram service was cut back to Shepparton, as it is today.

Strathmerton has a disused and rundown platform, and two disused home signals for up trains at the down end of the station. The points for the Cobram line have been lifted, with freight trains continuing to use the line north to Tocumwal.

References

Disused railway stations in Victoria (Australia)